The president of the Junta of Castile and León is the executive head of government of the Spanish autonomous community of Castile and León. The president is the head of the Junta of Castile and León, or regional government.

The current president of Castile and León is Alfonso Fernández Mañueco of the PP, who has held the office since July 11, 2019.

List of presidents of Castile and León

References

 
Castile and León